Coalcleugh is a hamlet in Northumberland, England. It is situated in the Pennines between Penrith and Hexham. In the past it was well known as a lead mining centre. All of Coalcleugh's lead ore was smelted at Allenheads Mill at Dirtpot. At 1750ft (530m) above sea level, it is said to be the highest hamlet in England.

Governance 
Coalcleugh is in the parliamentary constituency of Hexham.

References

External links

Hamlets in Northumberland